STPD is an abbreviation for:

Police Departments
 Southold Town Police Department
 Southampton Town Police Department
Sor-Trondelag Police District, Trondheim, Norway

Other
 SCSI Pass-Through Direct
 Short ton per day
 SMK Tinggi Port Dickson (a high school in Port Dickson, Malaysia).
 Schizotypal personality disorder